Space island or variation, may refer to:

In general
 Space station
 Space habitat
 Habitable planet

Specific aerospace projects
 Hilton Space Islands, a proposed space hotel chain
 Space Island Group (SIG), a space infrastructure company
 SIG Space Island Project, a proposed space infrastructure project

Other
 Islands of Space (novel), a 1957 U.S. science fiction novel by John W. Campbell
 Treasure Island in Outer Space (aka Space Island), a 1987 TV miniseries
 Space Island (album), a project under development by NZ band Broods
 "Space Island" (song), a tune from the soundtrack album for Coffee Prince (2007 TV series)
 Space Island (fictional location), a stage from the videogame series My Singing Monsters
 Space Island (film), an unmade 1950s Universal Pictures film competing with Conquest of Space

See also

 Space Island One (TV show), a 1998 TV series
 "Theme from Space Island" (song), a tune by !!! from 2004 album Louden Up Now
 Space (disambiguation)
 Island (disambiguation)